This is an incomplete list detailing the codenames and aliases used by F Section agents of the Special Operations Executive.

A 
 Achille - Roland Dowlen
 ACROBAT - John Starr
 ACTOR - Roger Landes
 Adele - Lisé de Baissac
 ADMINISTRATOR - John Allsop
 Agrippa - Nicholas Allington
 Alain - Georges Duboudin
 Alaric - Benjamin Aptaker
 Alcide - William Savy
 Alec - Adolphe Rabinovitch
 Alfred - Raymond Aubin
 Alice - Cecily Lefort
 ALMOND - Henry Newton
 ALMONER - Vera Leigh
 Alonce - John Allsop
 Alvar - René Bichelot
 Ambroise - Denise Bloch
 Annette - Yvonne Cormeau
 ANTAGONIST - Fred Agee
 Antoine - Philippe de Vomécourt
 Antonin - Fred Agee
 APOTHECARY - Jean-Paul Archambault
 Archambaud - Gilbert Norman
 ARCHDEACON - Frank Pickersgill
 Aristide - Roger Landes
 Arnaud - Adolphe Rabinovitch
 ARTIST - Lisé de Baissac
 Artus - Alfred Newton
 Astre - Roland Alexandre
 AUDITOR - Raymond Aubin
 Auguste - Henry Newton
 AUTHOR - Harry Peulevé
 AUTOGIRO - Pierre de Vomécourt
 AVENGER - Nicholas Allington

B 
 Bachelier, Raymond - René Bichelot
 BAGPIPER - René Bichelot
 Baker, Nora - Noor Inayat Khan
 BANDIT - Robert George Bruhl
 BARBER - Marcel Rousset
 Barberousse - Albert Benstead
 BARGEE - Adolphe Rabinovitch
 Barnabé - Robert George Bruhl
 BARNSTORMER - Joe Benoit
 Basil - Peter Lake
 Bastien - Marcel Clech 
 Bavelan, Aline - Alix D'Unienville
 BEADLE - Ralph Beauclerk
 Beauvalais, René Charles - Ralph Beauclerk
 BEGGAR - Maurice Basset
 BENEFACTRESS - Muriel Byck
 BERBERIO - Blanche Charlet
 Bernard, André Jean - André Bloch
 Bernier, Jeanne - Yvonne Baseden
 Bertrand - Frank Pickersgill
 Billet - Wilhelm Holst
 BILLSTICKER - Raphaël Beugnon
 BIOLOGIST - Robert Byerly
 BISHOP - Marcus Bloom
 Blanche - Sonya Butt
 BLOUSE - Lilian Rolfe
 Bob - John Starr
 BOMBPROOF - Georges Bégué
 BORER - Eugène Bec
 Boris - Joe Benoit
 Bourdet, René Maurice - Robert Boiteux
 Bouville, Jeannette - Lisé de Baissac
 Boyd, Alan George - André Bloch
 Brémontier, Roger - Robert Benoist
 BRICKLAYER - France Antelme
 Brisse, Irène - Lisé de Baissac
 BUCANNEER - Albert Benstead
 BURGLAR - Alcide Beauregard
 BURSAR - Yvonne Baseden
 BUTCHER - Gilbert Norman
 BUTLER - Jean Bouguennec

C
 Cardinal- FWM Reeve
 CAMELIA - Victor Hazan
 Camille - Virginia Hall
 CAMISOLE - Ralph Beauclerk
 Carlier, Lucienne Suzanne - Nancy Wake
 Casimir - Ralph Beauclerk
 CATALPHA - Adolphe Rabinovitch
 Célestin - Brian Stonehouse
 Chambrun, Pierre - Peter Churchill
 CHANCELLOR - George Millar
 CHAPLAIN - Diana Rowden
 Charles - Christopher Burney
 Chauvet, Pierre Marc - Peter Churchill
 Chauvigny, Yvonne Marie Yolande - Yolande Beekman
 CHEMIST - James Amps
 Chevalier, Henri - Harry Peulevé
 Chevalier, Jacques - Jack Agazarian
 Chico - Jean-Paul Archambault
 Christiane - Blanche Charlet
 Claire - Julienne Aisner
 Claudine - Mary Katherine Herbert
 Clement - Philippe Liewer
 CLOAK - Roger Landes
 Clothaire - Bob Maloubier
 CLOTHIER - Odette Sansom
 Colette - Anne-Marie Walters
 COMPOSITOR - Julienne Aisner
 de Courcelles, Philippe Robert - Philippe de Vomécourt
 CRINOLINE - Denise Bloch
 Cyrano - Alcide Beauregard

D 
 DANCER - Madeleine Damerment
 David - Claude de Baissac
 Davoust, Alice Thérèse - Anne-Marie Walters
 DEACON - Henri Gaillot
 DEAN - Eliane Plewman
 DECORATOR - Guy d'Artois
 Denis - Claude de Baissac
 Denise - Andrée Borrel
 DESIGNER - Jacqueline Nearne
 Desjardin, Guy Robert - Roméo Sabourin
 Desjardins, Françoise - Jacqueline Nearne
 Desprée, François - Francis Suttill
 DETECTIVE - Henri Sevenet
 Diane - Virginia Hall
 DICKY - Alcide Beauregard
 Didi - Eileen Nearne
 Dieudonné - Guy d'Artois
 Dieudonné - Gabriel Chartrand
 Dodkin, Kenneth - Forest Yeo-Thomas
 DONKEYMAN - Henri Frager
 Doucet, Roger François Marcel - Marcel Rousset
 DRAFTSMAN - André Bloch
 DRIVER - Georges Clément
 Dumontet, Joseph Marie Fernand - France Antelme
 Dussautoy, Martine - Madeleine Damerment
 Dusseret, Artus - Alfred Newton
 Dusseret, Hubert - Henry Newton
 Duterte, Jacqueline - Eileen Nearne

E 
 Élisabeth - Elizabeth Devereux-Rochester
 Edmond - Harry Peulevé
 Édouard - Georges Clément
 Émile - George Millar
 Émile - John Starr
 Eugene - Maurice Pertschuk

F 
 Fabre, Francine - Francine Agazarian
 FAIRY - Yvonne Cormeau
 Firmin - Robert Boiteux

G 
 Gaby - Eliane Plewman
 GARDENER - Robert Boiteux
 Garel, Francis - Jean Bouguennec
 Gaston - Noël Burdeyron
 Gauthier - Philippe de Vomécourt
 Gautier, Jacqueline - Yvonne Rudellat
 Genevieve - Phyllis Latour
 George I - Georges Bégué
 Georges IX - André Bloch
 George 53 - Edward Zeff
 George 60 - Marcel Cleff
 Gérard - Adolphe Rabinovitch
 Gervais - Victor Hazan
 Gilbert - Henri Déricourt
 GLAZIER - Jack Agazarian
 Gontrand - Robert Byerly
 GOWN - Muriel Byck
 GREENHEART - Alfred Newton
 GUARDIAN - Jean-Claude Guiet
 Guy - Gustave Biéler

H 
 HAIRDRESSER - Claude Arnault
 Hamlet - Philippe Liewer
 Hector - Maurice Southgate
 Hélène - Nancy Wake
 Henrique - Élisée Allard
 Hérault, René-Maurice - Bob Maloubier
 Hervé - Pierre Agapov
 Hilaire - Harry Peulevé
 Hilaire - George Starr
 Honoré - John Barrett
 Hugo - Raphaël Beugnon
 Hugues - Eugène Bec

I 
 Ignace - Henri Gaillot
 INNKEEPER - John Barrett
 Isabelle - Madeleine Latour

J 
 JAPONICA - Brian Stonehouse
 Jacqueline - Jacqueline Nearne
 Jean - Ernest Paul Bernard
 Jean - Harry Peulevé
 Jean-Marie - Henri Frager
 Jean-Pierre - Peter Lake
 JEWELLER - Mary Katherine Herbert
 JOCKEY - Francis Cammaerts
 José - Georges André
 Josette - Patricia O'Sullivan
 Jules - Ange Defendini
 Julien - Isidore Newman

K 
 KENNELMAID - Marguerite Knight
 KILT - Yolande Beekman

L 
 La Grande - Elizabeth Devereux-Rochester
 LAMPLIGHTER - Francine Agazarian
 La P'tite Anglaise - Violette Szabo
 Latour, Marianne - Madeleine Latour
 Laurent - Arthur Steele
 Leblanc, Maurice - Maurice Southgate
 Lebouton, Guy - Adolphe Rabinovitch
 Léger, Maurice Alfred - Gustave Biéler
 Léonard - Roméo Sabourin
 Léopold - Marcel Rousset
 Leroy, Corinne Reine - Violette Szabo
 LIBRARIAN - Benjamin Aptaker
 LIFTMAN - Peter Lake
 Lionel - Robert Benoist
 Lise - Odette Sansom
 de Lormes, Jacques André - François Vallée
 Louise - Violette Szabo
 Lucas - Pierre de Vomécourt
 Ludovic - Maurice Basset

M 
 MACKINTOSH - Harry Peulevé
 Madamoiselle du Tort - Eileen Nearne
 Madeleine - Noor Inayat Khan
 Malvalle, Robert - Bob Maloubier
 Marc, Georges Marie - George William Abbott
 Marcel - Jack Agazarian
 Marguerite - Francine Agazarian
 Marguerite - Lisé de Baissac
 Marie - Virginia Hall
 Marie - Pearl Witherington
 Marie of Lyons - Virginia Hall
 Marie-France - Alix D'Unienville
 Marie-Louise - Mary Katherine Herbert
 Mariette - Yolande Beekman
 Marius - Henri Borosh
 Martial - Georges Audouard
 Martin, Gaston René - Georges Bégué
 MASON - Jean-Marie Régnier
 Mathieu - Edward Zeff
 Mathieu - Henri Sevenet
 Maulnier, Jean Charles - John Macalister
 Maurice - France Antelme
 Max - Jean Bouguennec
 McKenzie, John - Roméo Sabourin
 Mercier, Georges Robert - Georges Bégué
 MESMERIST - Gabriel Chartrand
 Meunier, Charles - John Barrett
 Michel - Peter Churchill
 Michéle - Muriel Byck
 MILKMAID - Anne-Marie Walters
 Millet, Jean - William Savy
 MILLIONAIRE - Élisée Allard
 Mimi - Yvonne Fontaine
 Mollier, Robert - Bob Maloubier
 Monique - Andrée Borrel
 Montaigne, Charles - Élisée Allard
 Morin, Guy - Gustave Biéler
 MULBERRY - George William Abbott
 MUSICIAN - Gustave Biéler
 Myrtil - Alix D'Unienville

N 
 Nadine - Lilian Rolfe
 Néron - Claude Arnault
 Nestor - Jacques, René Édouard, Poirier
 Nicolas - Robert Boiteux
 Nicole - Marguerite Knight
 Normand, Alfred - Alfred Newton
 Norville, Josette - Jacqueline Nearne
 NOTARY - Georges Audouard
 NURSE - Noor Inayat Khan

O 
 OATS - Wilhelm Holst
 Odette - Yvonne Baseden
 Odile - Lisé de Baissac
 Olive - Francis Basin
 Oscar - François Vallée
 OVERCOAT - Adolphe Rabinovitch

P 
 Paco - Bob Maloubier
 PALMIST - Yolande Beekman
 PARSON - François Vallée
 Paul - George William Abbott
 Paulette - Diana Rowden
 Pauline - Christine Granville
 Pauline - Pearl Witherington
 Pélican - Louis Bertheau
 Perdrigé, Daniel - Robert Benoist
 Périer, Marie-Françoise - Anne-Marie Walters
 Perkins, Martin - Maurice Pertschuk
 Perrault, Gérard - Maurice Pertschuk
 Perrin, Éliane - Eliane Plewman
 Peter - Isidore Newman 
 Petit Fils - Louis Bertheau
 PETTICOAT - Eileen Nearne
 Philomène - Virginia Hall
 PHYSICIAN - Francis Suttill
 PIONEER - Eileen Nearne
 PLAYWRIGHT - Georges Duboudin
 PLUMBER - John Macalister
 Pol, René - Roger Landes
 Ponsot, Henri - George Starr
 PORTER - Bob Maloubier
 Porthos - Jean-Marie Régnier
 PRIEST - Ange Defendini
 Prosper - Francis Suttill
 PRUNUS - Maurice Pertschuk
 PULLOVER - Roméo Sabourin
 PUNJAB - Christine Granville

R 
 Raoul - Peter Churchill
 Ratier, Antoine - France Antelme
 Raymond - Pierre Agapov
 RECLUSE - Lilian Rolfe
 Régnier, Jeanne-Marie - Noor Inayat Khan
 Renaud - France Antelme
 René - Jean-Marie Renaud-Dandicolle
 René - Victor Gerson
 Rodier, Claude Irène - Lilian Rolfe
 Rodolphe - Henri Sevenet
 Roger - Francis Cammaerts
 Rondeau, Juliette Thérèse - Diana Rowden
 Rose - Eileen Nearne

S 
 St. Paul - Philippe de Vomécourt
 SALESMAN - Philippe Liewer
 SARAFARI - Yvonne Cormeau
 Saulnier, Arthur - Arthur Steele
 SCIENTIST - Claude de Baissac
 SEAMSTRESS - Violette Szabo
 Sebastien - William Grover-Williams
 SECRETARY - Denise Bloch
 Shelley - Forest Yeo-Thomas
 SILVERSMITH - Henri Borosh
 Simone - Vera Leigh
 Simonet - Patricia O'Sullivan
 Simonet, Micheline Marcelle - Patricia O'Sullivan
 SOAPTREE - Yvonne Rudellat
 Solange - Madeleine Damerment
 SORCEROR - Roméo Sabourin
 SPINDLE - Peter Churchill
 SPRUCE - Georges Duboudin
 Stanislas - Roger Landes
 STATIONER - Maurice Southgate
 Staunton, Charles Geoffrey Mark - Philippe Liewer
 STAYER - Adrien Berge
 STENOGRAPHER - Patricia O'Sullivan
 Stéphane - John Barrett
 STOCKING - Patricia O'Sullivan
 SUIT - Robert Byerly
 SURVEYOR - Roland Alexandre
 Suzanne - Yvonne Rudellat
 Sylvain - Pierre de Vomécourt
 Sylvestre - Michael Trotobas

T 
 Tailor, Vicky - Violette Szabo
 Tania - Sonia Olschanezky
 TAXIDERMIST - Phillip Amphlett
 TEACHER - Cecily Lefort
 Thierry, François-Yves - Forest Yeo-Thomas
 Thomas, Henry - Henri Sevenet
 TIPPET - Adrien Berge
 Tirelli - Forest Yeo-Thomas
 TOGA - Yvonne Baseden
 Tomas - James Amps
 Tournier, Marie Louise - Eileen Nearne
 Tutur - Adrien Berge
 TYPIST - Elizabeth Devereux-Rochester

U 
 Urbain - Marcus Bloom
 URCHIN - Francis Basin
 USHER - Jack Agazarian

V 
 Valentin - John Macalister
 VENTRILOQUIST - Philippe de Vomécourt
 Violette - Muriel Byck
 Virgile - Jean-Claude Guiet
 Vladimir - Maurice Louis Larcher

W 
 WAITER - Arthur Steele
 Watremez, Serge - George Starr
 WITCH - Nancy Wake
 WIZARD - William Savy
 WHEELWRIGHT - George Starr
 WHITEBEAM - Andrée Borrel
 White Mouse - Nancy Wake
 Williams, Danielle - Denise Bloch
 Wood, Alice - Eileen Nearne
 WRAP - Marcel Rousset

X
 Xavier - Richard Harry Heslop

Y 
 Yvonne - Yolande Beekman

Special Operations Executive